Real character may refer to:
 An Essay towards a Real Character, and a Philosophical Language
 In mathematics, a real character.